The 1983 Brabantse Pijl was the 23rd edition of the Brabantse Pijl cycle race and was held on 27 March 1983. The race started in Sint-Genesius-Rode and finished in Alsemberg. The race was won by Eddy Planckaert.

General classification

References

1983
Brabantse Pijl